Andrey Bakhno (born 25 November 1973) is a retired Belarusian professional footballer.

Career
He spent the majority of his career in Granit Mikashevichi, as a player and later as director. His older brother Valery Bakhno is also a former footballer and head coach in Granit Mikashevichi.

External links

Belarusian footballers
FC Shakhtyor Soligorsk players
FK Žalgiris players
FC Granit Mikashevichi players
1973 births
Living people
Belarusian expatriate footballers
Expatriate footballers in Poland
Expatriate footballers in Lithuania
Association football defenders
Sportspeople from Brest Region